Milkybar, called Galak in Continental Europe and Latin America, is a white chocolate confection produced by Nestlé since 1936 and sold worldwide. According to Nestlé, Milkybar/Galak contains no artificial colours, flavours or preservatives. In Australia and New Zealand, Milkybar does not contain cocoa butter, and is therefore not labelled as chocolate.

Advertising

Milkybar Kid

Since 1961, the Milkybar Kid has been used in television advertising promoting Nestlé Milkybar. The Milkybar Kid is a blond, spectacle-wearing young child, usually dressed as a cowboy, whose catchphrase is "The Milkybars are on me!". The advertisements usually take place in a Wild West setting, and both live-action and animated ads have been produced. Until 8-year-old Hinetaapora Short of New Zealand was selected in 2010, the character had always been male.

In the UK, Australia and New Zealand the advertisements were originally accompanied by a jingle extolling "the goodness that's in Milky Bar". In more recent revivals of the campaign, the jingle has been revised to refer to "the good taste that's in Milkybar".

Galak
Galak was promoted using the 1971 French animated series Oum le Dauphin Blanc ("Zoom the White Dolphin"), with its characters appearing on packaging and in commercials.  In commercials, two children, Yann and Marina, and the white dolphin Oum typically overcome villains such as pirates or sharks.  Nestlé terminated their use of this licence in 2003, though the likeness of Oum remained on some stocks sold in 2004, which led the series' owners to sue for royalties.

References

External links 
 

Brand name confectionery
British confectionery
Chocolate bars
Nestlé brands
Products introduced in 1930